Pırlanta (Diamond) is the ninth studio album by Turkish singer Demet Akalın. It was released on 19 June 2015 by Doğan Music Company. It was Demet Akalın's first album to be released by this production company. Its lead single "Ders Olsun" ranked second on Turkey's official music chart, and the album itself became the best-selling album in Turkey in 2015.

Music videos
The album's lead single "Ders Olsun" was written and composed by Sinan Akçıl and arranged by Volga Tamöz. Its music video was directed by Müjdat Küpşi. The second music video was prepared for the song "Gölge" under Müjdat Küpşi's direction and was shot in Bodrum over the course of three days. In the music video for "Çalkala", which was also directed by Müjdat Kupşi, Akalın was accompanied by 8 dancers. The music video was first shown to the public on 17 October 2015 during Akalın's concert at the Bostancı Show Center. The fourth music video was produced for the song "Beş Yıl", written and composed by Berkay and arranged by Çağrı Telkıvıran. It was directed by Sedat Doğan and shot over the course of two days in Garipçe, Istanbul. It was followed by "Pırlanta", whose music video was directed by Tamer Aydoğdu. The album's sixth music video was prepared and released for the song "Şerefime Namusuma". The song was written and composed by Soner Sarıkabadayı and arranged by Erdem Kınay. In the music video, which was directed by Tamer Aydoğdu, Akalın appeared together with her husband Okan Kurt. Demet Akalın later announced on her Twitter account that the last music video from Pırlanta would be made for the song "Özüme Döndüm", but the plan was later cancelled.

Track listing

Personnel 
 Supervisor: Demet Akalın
 Producer: Samsun Demir
 Photographs: Sedat Doğan
 Hair: Nuri Şekerci
 Make-up: Mutlu Genç
 Graphic design: Ebru Aydemir | DS
 Printing: GD Ofset

Sales

Notes

References 

2015 albums
Demet Akalın albums
Turkish-language albums